Histone deacetylase 4, also known as HDAC4, is a protein that in humans is encoded by the HDAC4 gene.

Function 
Histones play a critical role in transcriptional regulation, cell cycle progression, and developmental events. Histone acetylation/deacetylation alters chromosome structure and affects transcription factor access to DNA. The protein encoded by this gene belongs to class II of the histone deacetylase/acuc/apha family. It possesses histone deacetylase activity and represses transcription when tethered to a promoter. This protein does not bind DNA directly but through transcription factors MEF2C and MEF2D. It seems to interact in a multiprotein complex with RbAp48 and HDAC3.  Furthermore, HDAC4 is required for TGFbeta1-induced myofibroblastic differentiation.

Clinical significance 
Studies have shown that HDAC4 regulates bone and muscle development.  Harvard University researchers also concluded that it promotes healthy vision: Reduced levels of the protein led to the death of the rod photoreceptors and bipolar cells in the retinas of mice.

Interactions 

HDAC4 has been shown to interact with:

 BCL6, 
 BTG2, 
 CBX5, 
 GATA1,
 HDAC3, 
 MAPK1, 
 MAPK3, 
 MEF2C, 
 Myocyte-specific enhancer factor 2A, 
 Nuclear receptor co-repressor 1, 
 Nuclear receptor co-repressor 2, 
 Testicular receptor 2, 
 YWHAB, 
 YWHAE, and
 Zinc finger and BTB domain-containing protein 16.

See also 
 Histone deacetylase

References

Further reading

External links 
 

EC 3.5.1